White hat, white hats, or white-hat may refer to:

Art, entertainment, and media
 White hat, a way of thinking in Edward de Bono's book Six Thinking Hats
 White hat, part of black and white hat symbolism in film

Other uses
 White hat (computer security), a computer hacker intending to improve security
 White hat, a U.S. Navy version of a sailor cap
 White hat bias, the tendency to accept desired findings with less evidence than is required to prove other outcomes
 White Hat [American Football] - Used to refer to the Referee

See also
Black hat (disambiguation)